Oxenford may refer to:

A ford (crossing) for use by oxen
Oxenford, Queensland
Historic name of Oxford, Oxfordshire, a city in England
Alexander Oxenford, MP
Bruce Oxenford (born 1960), Australian cricket umpire
Daphne Oxenford (1919–2012), English actress
Earle Oxenford, the present-day leading candidate for alternative "Shakespeare" authorship
John Oxenford (1812–1877), English dramatist
Juliana Oxenford, Argentine-Peruvian journalist
Peter Pilkington, Baron Pilkington of Oxenford (1933–2011), Conservative member of the House of Lords

See also
Oxford (disambiguation)